This is a list of seasons completed by the University of Minnesota Golden Gophers men's ice hockey team.  The list documents the season-by-season records of the Golden Gophers from 1921 to present, including postseason records, and league awards for individual players or head coaches.

Minnesota has won five NCAA Men's Division I Ice Hockey Championships (1974, 1976, 1979, 2002, 2003) and has been the runner-up seven times (1953, 1954, 1971, 1975, 1981, 1989, 2014). The team also shared the 1929 National Intercollegiate Athletic Association championship with Yale and won the 1940 AAU-sponsored national championship for amateur hockey.  In their 91-year history, they have played over 2800 games and have an all-time winning percentage of .629.  The Gophers have made an NCAA-leading thirty-six NCAA postseason appearances since tournament play began in 1948.  Their twenty-one Frozen Four appearances are bettered by two teams: the University of Michigan (twenty-four), Boston College (twenty-four).  Minnesota is also one of only five teams to win consecutive national titles (the others being Boston University, University of Denver, University of Michigan and Minnesota-Duluth).  The Golden Gophers have been named the WCHA's regular season champion fourteen times, its tournament champion fourteen times, the Big Ten Hockey Conference's regular season champion four times, and its conference tournament champion twice.

Season-by-season results

Note: GP = Games played, W = Wins, L = Losses, T = Ties

†Sonmor resigned in December of 1971.‡Mike Guentzel Served as an interim coach for a total of three games in two seasons while Doug Woog was suspended.

Footnotes

References

Specific

General

 
 

 
Minnesota
Minnesota Golden Gophers ice hockey seasons